Ground biscuit is a form of biscuit, usually baked, flour-based food products, that is specially processed by grinding. It is usually served with warm or cold milk or tea; or it can served in a crepe.  One recipe for biscuit powder was originally based on the Italian plasmon biscuits made by the Plasmon Society (now owned by the H. J. Heinz Company). Biscuit powders like  Plazma are popular in countries of former Yugoslavia and are also exported to other countries.

Serving 

Ground biscuit can be combined with milk or crushed and served with crepes.  They are used as an ingredient of many sweets, such as ice cream cake and milkshakes.

References

Biscuits
European cuisine
Serbian cuisine
Twice-baked goods
Powders